Daimon (δαίμων) is an Ancient Greek word referring to lesser supernatural beings, including minor gods and the spirits of dead heroes. 

Daimon may also refer to:

Daimon (Head Chief) (died 1930), Head Chief of Nauru during the 1920s
Daimon, Toyama, Chūbu, Honshū, Japan
Daimon (name)
 Daemon, a service in a Unix operating system

See also
Demon (disambiguation)
Daimonic